Suppressor of cytokine signaling 7 is a protein that in humans is encoded by the SOCS7 gene.

Model organisms

Model organisms have been used in the study of SOCS7 function. A conditional knockout mouse line, called Socs7tm1a(EUCOMM)Wtsi was generated as part of the International Knockout Mouse Consortium program—a high-throughput mutagenesis project to generate and distribute animal models of disease to interested scientists.

Male and female animals underwent a standardized phenotypic screen to determine the effects of deletion. Twenty five tests were carried out on mutant mice and one significant abnormality was observed: homozygous mutant males showed a decreased response to stress-induced hyperthermia.

Interactions 

SOCS7 has been shown to interact with NCK1.

References

Further reading 

 
 
 
 
 
 
 
 
 
 

Genes mutated in mice